The 1930s (pronounced "nineteen-thirties" and commonly abbreviated as "the '30s" or "the Thirties") was a decade that began on January 1, 1930, and ended on December 31, 1939. In the United States, the Dust Bowl led to the nickname the "Dirty Thirties".

The decade was defined by a global economic and political crisis that culminated in the Second World War. It saw the collapse of the international financial system, beginning with the Wall Street Crash of 1929, the largest stock market crash in American history. The subsequent economic downfall, called the Great Depression, had traumatic social effects worldwide, leading to widespread poverty and unemployment, especially in the economic superpower of the United States and in Germany, which was already struggling with the payment of reparations for the First World War. The Dust Bowl in the United States (which led to the nickname the "Dirty Thirties") exacerbated the scarcity of wealth. U.S. President Franklin D. Roosevelt, elected in 1933, introduced a program of broad-scale social reforms and stimulus plans called the New Deal in response to the crisis. The Soviet's second five-year plan gave heavy industry top priority, putting the Soviet Union not far behind Germany as one of the major steel-producing countries of the world, while also improving communications. First-wave feminism made advances, with women gaining the right to vote in South Africa (1930, whites only), Brazil (1933), and Cuba (1933). Following the rise of Adolf Hitler and the emergence of the NSDAP as the country's sole legal party in 1933, Germany imposed a series of laws which discriminated against Jews and other ethnic minorities.

Germany adopted an aggressive foreign policy, remilitarizing the Rhineland (1936), annexing Austria (1938) and the Sudetenland (1938), before invading Poland (1939) and starting World War II near the end of the decade. Italy likewise continued its already aggressive foreign policy, defeating the Libyan resistance (1932) before invading Ethiopia (1936) and then Albania (1939). Both Germany and Italy became involved in the Spanish Civil War, supporting the eventually victorious Nationalists led by Francisco Franco against the Republicans, who were in turn supported by the Soviet Union. The Chinese Civil War was halted due to the need to confront Japanese imperial ambitions, with the Kuomintang and the Chinese Communist Party forming a Second United Front to fight Japan in the Second Sino-Japanese War. Lesser conflicts included interstate wars such as the Colombia–Peru War (1932–1933), the Chaco War (1932–1935) and the Saudi–Yemeni War (1934), as well as internal conflicts in Brazil (1932), Ecuador (1932), El Salvador (1932), Austria (1934) and Palestine (1936–1939).

Severe famine took place in the major grain-producing areas of the Soviet Union between 1930 and 1933, leading to 5.7 to 8.7 million deaths. Major contributing factors to the famine include: the forced collectivization in the Soviet Union of agriculture as a part of the First Five-Year Plan, forced grain procurement, combined with rapid industrialization, a decreasing agricultural workforce, and several severe droughts. A famine of similar scope also took place in China from 1936 to 1937, killing 5 million people. The 1931 China floods caused 422,499–4,000,000 deaths. Major earthquakes of this decade include the 1935 Quetta earthquake (30,000–60,000 deaths) and the 1939 Erzincan earthquake (32,700–32,968 deaths).

With the advent of sound in 1927, the musical—the genre best placed to showcase the new technology—took over as the most popular type of film with audiences, with the animated musical fantasy film Snow White and the Seven Dwarfs (1937) becoming the highest-grossing film of this decade in terms of gross rentals. In terms of distributor rentals, Gone with the Wind (1939), an epic historical romance film, was the highest-grossing film of this decade and remains the highest-grossing film (when adjusted for inflation) to this day. Popular novels of this decade include the historical fiction novels The Good Earth, Anthony Adverse and Gone with the Wind, all three of which were best-selling novels in the United States for 2 consecutive years. Cole Porter was a popular music artist in the 1930s, with two of his songs, "Night and Day" and "Begin the Beguine" becoming No. 1 hits in 1932 and 1935 respectively. The latter song was of the Swing genre, which had begun to emerge as the most popular form of music in the United States since 1933.

Politics and wars

Wars

 Colombia–Peru War (September 1, 1932 – May 24, 1933) – fought between the Republic of Colombia and the Republic of Peru
 Chaco War (June 15, 1932 – June 10, 1935) – fought between Bolivia and Paraguay over the disputed territory of Gran Chaco, resulting in a Paraguayan victory in 1935; an agreement dividing the territory was made in 1938, formally ending the conflict
 Saudi–Yemeni War (March 1934 – May 12, 1934) – fought between Saudi Arabia and the Mutawakkilite Kingdom of Yemen
 Second Italo-Ethiopian War (October 3, 1935 – February 19, 1937)
 Second Sino-Japanese War (July 7, 1937 – September 9, 1945) – fought between the Republic of China and the Empire of Japan. It was the largest Asian war of the 20th century, and made up more than 50% of the casualties in the Pacific theater of World War II.
 World War II (September 1, 1939 – September 2, 1945) – global war centered in Europe and the Pacific but involving the majority of the world's countries, including all of the major powers such as Germany, Russia, America, Italy, Japan, France and the United Kingdom.

Internal conflicts
 Chinese Civil War (1927–1949) – The ruling Kuomintang and the rebel Chinese Communist Party fought a civil war for control of China. The Communists consolidated territory in the early 1930s and proclaimed a short-lived Chinese Soviet Republic that collapsed upon Kuomintang attacks, forcing a mass retreat known as the Long March. The Kuomintang and Communists attempted to put away their differences after 1937 to fight the Japanese invasion of China, but intermittent clashes continued through the remainder of the 1930s. Even with some clashes they all fought the Japanese.
 Spanish Civil War (July 17, 1936 – April 1, 1939) – Germany and Italy backed the anti-communist Falange forces of Francisco Franco. The Soviet Union and international communist parties (see Abraham Lincoln Brigade) backed the left-wing republican faction in the war. The war ended in April 1939 with Franco's nationalist forces defeating the republican forces. Franco became Head of State of Spain and President of Government, and the Republic of Spain gave way to the Spanish State, an authoritarian dictatorship.
 Castellammarese War (1929 – September 10, 1931) – Italian-American criminal organizations engaged in a gang war for control of the American Mafia on the East Coast of the United States.

Major political changes

Germany – Rise of Nazism

 The NSDAP (Nazi Party) under Adolf Hitler wins the German federal election, March 1933. Hitler becomes Chancellor of Germany. Following the 1934 death in office of Paul von Hindenburg, President of Germany, Hitler's cabinet passes a law proclaiming the presidency vacant and transferring the role and powers of the head of state to Hitler, hereafter known as Führer und Reichskanzler (leader and chancellor). The Weimar Republic effectively gives way to Nazi Germany, a Totalitarian autocratic national socialist dictatorship committed to repudiating the Treaty of Versailles, persecuting and removing Jews and other minorities from German society, expanding Germany's territory, and opposing the spread of communism.
 Hitler pulls Germany out of the League of Nations, but hosts the 1936 Summer Olympics to show his new Reich to the world as well as the supposed superior athleticism of his Aryan troops/athletes.
 Neville Chamberlain, Prime Minister of the United Kingdom (1937–1940), attempts the appeasement of Hitler in hope of avoiding war by allowing the dictator to annex the Sudetenland (the German-speaking regions of Czechoslovakia) and later signing the Munich Agreement and promising constituents "Peace for our time". He is ousted in favor of Winston Churchill in May 1940, following the German invasion of Norway.
 The assassination of the German diplomat Ernst vom Rath by a German-born Polish Jew triggers the Kristallnacht ("Night of Broken Glass") which occurred between 9 and 10 November 1938, carried out by the Hitler Youth, the Gestapo, and the SS, during which much of the Jewish population living in Nazi Germany and Austria was attacked – 91 Jews were murdered, and between 25,000 and 30,000 more were arrested and sent to Nazi concentration camps. Some 267 synagogues were destroyed, and thousands of homes and businesses were ransacked. Kristallnacht also served as the pretext for the wholesale confiscation of firearms from German Jews.
 Germany and Italy pursue territorial expansionist agendas. Germany demands the annexation of the Federal State of Austria and of other German-speaking territories in Europe. Between 1935 and 1936, Germany recovers the Saar and re-militarizes the Rhineland. Italy initially opposes Germany's aims for Austria, but in 1936 the two countries resolve their differences in the aftermath of Italy's diplomatic isolation following the start of the Second Italo-Abyssinian War, and Germany becomes Italy's only remaining ally. Germany and Italy improve relations by forming an alliance against communism in 1936 with the signing of the Anti-Comintern Pact. Germany annexes Austria in the Anschluss; the annexation of the Sudetenland follows negotiations which result in the Munich Agreement of 1938. The Italian invasion of Albania in 1939 succeeds in turning the Kingdom of Albania into an Italian protectorate. The vacant Albanian throne is claimed by Victor Emmanuel III of Italy. Germany receives the Memel territory from Lithuania, occupies what remains of Czechoslovakia, and finally invades the Second Polish Republic, the last of these events resulting in the outbreak of World War II.
 In 1939, several countries of the Americas, including Canada, Cuba, and the United States, controversially deny asylum to hundreds of German Jewish refugees on board the MS St. Louis who are fleeing the Nazi regime's racist agenda of anti-Semitic persecution in Germany. In the end, no country accepts the refugees, and the ship returns to Germany with most of its passengers on board. Some commit suicide, rather than return to Nazi Germany.

United States – Combating the Depression

 Franklin D. Roosevelt is elected President of the United States in November 1932. Roosevelt initiates a widespread social welfare strategy called the "New Deal" to combat the economic and social devastation of the Great Depression. The economic agenda of the "New Deal" was a radical departure from previous laissez-faire economics.

Saudi Arabia – Founding
 The Kingdom of Hejaz and Nejd is proclaimed the Kingdom of Saudi Arabia, concluding the country's unification under the rule of Ibn Saud.

Spain – Turmoil and Civil War
 The Republican parties win the local elections, and proclaim the Second Republic, kicking out the monarchy of Alfonso XIII of Borbón.
 The Spanish coup of July 1936 against the Republic marks the beginning of the Spanish Civil War.

Colonization
 The Ethiopian Empire is invaded by the Kingdom of Italy during the Second Italo-Abyssinian War from 1935 to 1936. The occupied territory merges with Eritrea and Italian Somaliland into the colony of Italian East Africa.
 The Empire of Japan captures Manchuria in 1931, creating the puppet state of Manchukuo. A puppet government was created, with Puyi, the last Qing dynasty Emperor of China, installed as the nominal regent and emperor.

Decolonization and independence
 In March 1930 Mohandas Gandhi leads the non-violent Satyagraha movement in the Declaration of the Independence of India and the Salt March.
 The Government of India Act 1935 creates new directly elected bodies, although with a limited franchise, and increases the autonomy of the Presidencies and provinces of British India.

Other prominent political events
The Great Depression seriously affects the economic, political, and social aspects of society across the world.
The League of Nations collapses as countries like Germany, the Kingdom of Italy, and the Empire of Japan abdicate the League.

Europe

 In 1930, Miguel Primo de Rivera, Prime Minister of Spain and head of a military dictatorship is forced to resign in response to a financial crisis (part of the Great Depression). Alfonso XIII of Spain, who had previously backed the dictatorship, attempts to return gradually to the previous system and restore his prestige. This failed utterly, as the King was considered a supporter of the dictatorship, and more and more political forces called for the establishment of a republic. In 1931, republican and socialist parties won a major victory in the local elections, while the monarchists were in decline. Street riots ensued, calling for the removal of the monarchy. The Spanish Army declared that they would not defend the King. Alfonso flees the country, effectively abdicating and ending the Bourbon Restoration phase which had started in the 1870s. A Second Spanish Republic emerges.
 In the Soviet Union, agricultural collectivization and rapid industrialization take place. Millions died during the Holodomor.
 More than 25 million people migrate to cities in the Soviet Union.
 Anglo-German Naval Agreement is signed in 1935, removing the Treaty of Versailles' level of limitation on the size of the Kriegsmarine (navy). The agreement allows Germany to build a larger naval force.
 Éamon de Valera introduces a new constitution for the Irish Free State in 1937, effectively ending its status as a British Dominion.
 The "Great Purge" of "Old Bolsheviks" from the Communist Party of the Soviet Union takes place from 1936 to 1938, as ordered by Soviet Union leader Joseph Stalin, resulting in hundreds of thousands of people being killed. This purge was due to mistrust and political differences, as well as the massive drop in Grain produce. This was due to the method of collectivization in Russia. The Soviet Union produced 16 million lbs of grain less in 1934 compared to 1930. This led to the starvation of millions of Russians.
 The 1937 World's Fair in Paris displays the growing political tensions in Europe. The pavilions of the rival countries of Nazi Germany and the Soviet Union face each other. Germany at the time was internationally condemned for Luftwaffe (its air force) having performed a bombing of the Basque town of Guernica in Spain during the Spanish Civil War. Spanish artist Pablo Picasso depicted the bombing in his masterpiece painting Guernica at the World Fair, which was a surrealist depiction of the horror of the bombing. 
 Referendum in the Irish Free State in December 1937 on whether Ireland should continue to be a constitutional monarchy under King George VI or to become a republic results in citizens voting in favour of a republic, ending the remains of British sovereignty through monarchial authority over the state.

Africa
 Hertzog of South Africa, whose National Party had won the 1929 election alone after splitting with the Labour Party, received much of the blame for the devastating economic impact of the Depression.

America
 Canada and other countries under the British Empire sign the Statute of Westminster in 1931, establishing effective parliamentary independence of Canada from the parliament of the United Kingdom.
 United States Marine Corps general Smedley Butler confesses to the U.S. Congress in 1934 that a group of industrialists contacted him, requesting his aid to overthrow the U.S. government of Roosevelt and establish what he claimed would be a fascist regime in the United States.
 1939 New York World's Fair, the USA displays the pavilions showing art, culture, and technology from the whole world.
 Newfoundland voluntarily returns to British colonial rule in 1934 amid its economic crisis during the Great Depression with the creation of the Commission of Government, a non-elected body.
 Canadian Prime Minister W. L. Mackenzie King meets with German Führer Adolf Hitler in 1937 in Berlin. King is the only North American head of government to meet with Hitler.
 Amelia Earhart receives major attention in the 1930s as the first woman pilot to conduct major air flights. Her disappearance for unknown reasons in 1937 while on flight prompted search efforts that failed.
 Southern Great Plains devastated by decades-long Dust Bowl
 In 1932, the Polish Cipher Bureau broke the German Enigma cipher and overcame the ever-growing structural and operating complexities of the evolving Enigma machine with plugboard, the main German cipher device during World War II.
 Board of Temperance Strategy established in the U.S. to fight repeal of prohibition
 Getúlio Vargas became the President of Brazil after the 1930 coup d'état.

Asia

 Major international media attention follows Mohandas Gandhi's peaceful resistance movement against the British colonial rule in India.
 Chinese Communist Party leader Mao Zedong forms the small enclave state called the Chinese Soviet Republic in 1931.
 The Gandhi–Irwin Pact is signed by Mohandas Gandhi and Lord Irwin, Viceroy of India, on March 5, 1931. Gandhi agrees to end the campaign of civil disobedience being carried out by the Indian National Congress (INC) in exchange for Irwin accepting the INC to participate in roundtable talks on British colonial policy in India.
 The Government of India Act of 1935 is enacted by the Governor-General of India, separating British Burma to become a separate British possession and also increasing the political autonomy of the remaining presidencies and provinces of British India.
 Mao Zedong's Chinese communists begin a large retreat from advancing nationalist forces, called the Long March, beginning in October 1934 and ending in October 1936 and resulting in the collapse of the Chinese Soviet Republic.
 Colonial India's Muslim League leader Muhammed Ali Jinnah delivers his "Day of Deliverance" speech on December 2, 1939, calling upon Muslims to begin to engage in civil disobedience against the British colonial government starting on December 12. Jinnah demands redress and resolution to tensions and violence occurring between Muslims and Hindus in India. Jinnah's actions are not supported by the largely Hindu-dominated Indian National Congress whom he had previously closely allied with. The decision is seen as part of an agenda by Jinnah to support the eventual creation of an independent Muslim state called Pakistan from British Empire.

Australia
 Australia and New Zealand sign the Statute of Westminster in 1931 which established legislative equality between the self-governing dominions of the British Empire and the United Kingdom, with a few residual exceptions. The Parliament of Australia and Parliament of New Zealand gain full legislative authority over their territories, no longer sharing powers with the Parliament of the United Kingdom.

Disasters
 The China floods of 1931 are among the deadliest natural disasters ever recorded.

 The 1935 Labor Day Hurricane makes landfall in the Florida Keys as a Category 5 hurricane and the most intense hurricane to ever make landfall in the Atlantic basin. It caused an estimated $6 million (1935 USD) in damages and killed around 408 people. The hurricane's strong winds and storm surge destroyed nearly all of the structures between Tavernier and Marathon, and the town of Islamorada was obliterated.
 The German dirigible airship Hindenburg explodes in the sky above Lakehurst, New Jersey, United States on May 6, 1937, killing 36 people. The event leads to an investigation of the explosion and the disaster causes major public distrust of the use of hydrogen-inflated airships and seriously damages the reputation of the Zeppelin company.
 The New London School in New London, Texas, is destroyed by an explosion, killing in excess of 300 students and teachers (1937).
 The New England Hurricane of 1938, which became a Category 5 hurricane before making landfall as a Category 3. The hurricane was estimated to have caused property losses of US$306 million ($4.72 billion in 2010), killed between 682 and 800 people, and damaged or destroyed over 57,000 homes, including the home of famed actress Katharine Hepburn, who had been staying in her family's Old Saybrook, Connecticut, beach home when the hurricane struck.
 The Dust Bowl, or "Dirty Thirties", a period of severe dust storms causing major ecological and agricultural damage to American and Canadian prairie lands from 1930 to 1936 (in some areas until 1940). Caused by extreme drought coupled with strong winds and decades of extensive farming without crop rotation, fallow fields, cover crops, or other techniques to prevent erosion, it affected an estimated  of land (traveling as far east as New York and the Atlantic Ocean), caused mass migration (which was the inspiration for the Pulitzer Prize-winning novel The Grapes of Wrath by John Steinbeck), food shortages, multiple deaths and illness from sand inhalation (see History in Motion), and a severe reduction in the going wage rate.
 The 1938 Yellow River flood pours out from Huayuankou, China, inundating  of land and killing an estimated 500,000 people.

Assassinations and attempts
Prominent assassinations, targeted killings, and assassination attempts include:

 A plan to kill the English film star Charlie Chaplin, who had arrived in Japan on May 14, 1932, at a reception for him, was planned by activists eager to ingest a nativist Yamato spirit into politics. Chaplin's murder would facilitate war with the U.S., and anxiety in Japan, and lead on to "restoration" in the name of the emperor. However, excepting the death of the prime minister, the coup came to nothing, and the murderers gave themselves in to the police willingly.
 French president Paul Doumer is assassinated in 1932 by Paul Gorguloff, a mentally unstable Russian émigré.
 U.S. presidential candidate and former Governor of Louisiana Huey Long is assassinated in 1935 by Carl Weiss.
 Engelbert Dollfuss, Chancellor of Austria and leading figure of Austrofascism, is assassinated in 1934 by Austrian Nazis. Germany and Italy nearly clash over the issue of Austrian independence despite close ideological similarities of the Italian Fascist and Nazi regimes.
 Alexander I of Yugoslavia is assassinated in 1934 during a visit to Marseille, France. His assassin was Vlado Chernozemski, a member of the Internal Macedonian Revolutionary Organization. The IMRO was a political organization that fought for secession of Vardar Macedonia from Yugoslavia.

Economics

 The Great Depression is considered to have begun with the fall of stock prices on September 4, 1929, and then the stock market crash known as Black Tuesday on October 29, 1929, and lasted through much of the 1930s.
 The entire decade is marked by widespread unemployment and poverty, although deflation (i.e. falling prices) was limited to 1930–32 and 1938–39. Prices fell 7.02% in 1930, 10.06% in 1931, 9.79% in 1932, 1.41% in 1938 and 0.71% in 1939.
 Economic interventionist policies increase in popularity as a result of the Great Depression in both authoritarian and democratic countries. In the Western world, Keynesianism replaces classical economic theory.
 In an effort to reduce unemployment, the United States government created work projects such as the Civilian Conservation Corps (CCC) which was a public work relief program that operated from 1933 to 1942 to maintain National Parks and build roads. Other major U.S. government work projects included Hoover Dam which was constructed between 1931 and 1936.
 Rapid industrialization takes place in the Soviet Union.
 Prohibition in the United States ended in 1933. On December 5, 1933, the ratification of the Twenty-first Amendment repealed the Eighteenth Amendment to the United States Constitution.
 Drought conditions in Oklahoma and Texas caused the Dust Bowl which forced tens of thousands of families to abandon their farms and seek employment elsewhere.

Science and technology

Technology
Many technological advances occurred in the 1930s, including:
 On March 8, 1930, the first frozen foods of Clarence Birdseye were sold in Springfield, Massachusetts, United States.
 Nestlé releases the first white chocolate candy as the Milkybar.;
 Ub Iwerks produced the first Color Sound Cartoon in 1930, a Flip the Frog cartoon entitled "Fiddlesticks";
 In 1930, Warner Brothers released the first All-Talking All-Color wide-screen movie, Song of the Flame; in 1930 alone, Warner Brothers released ten All-Color All-Talking feature movies in Technicolor and scores of shorts and features with color sequences;
 Air mail service across the Atlantic Ocean began;
 Radar was invented, known as RDF (Radio Direction Finding), such as in British Patent GB593017 by Robert Watson-Watt in 1938;
 In 1933, the 3M company marketed Scotch Tape;
 In 1931, RCA Victor introduced the first long-playing phonograph record.
 In 1935, the British London and North Eastern Railway introduced the A4 Pacific, designed by Nigel Gresley. Just three years later, one of these, No. 4468 Mallard, would become the fastest steam locomotive in the world.
 In 1935, Kodachrome is invented, being the first color film made by Eastman Kodak.
 In 1936, The first regular high-definition (then defined as at least 200 lines) television service from the BBC, based at Alexandra Palace in London, officially begins broadcasting.
Nuclear fission discovered by Otto Hahn, Lise Meitner and Fritz Strassman in 1939.
 The Volkswagen Beetle, one of the best selling automobiles ever produced, had its roots in Nazi Germany in the late 1930s. Created by Ferdinand Porsche and his chief designer Erwin Komenda. The car would prove to be successful, and is still in production today as the New Beetle.
 In 1935, Howard Hughes, flying the H-1, set the landplane airspeed record of 352 mph (566 km/h).
 In 1937, flying the same H-1 Racer fitted with longer wings, the ambitious Hughes sets a new transcontinental airspeed record by flying non-stop from Los Angeles to Newark in 7 hours, 28 minutes, and 25 seconds (beating his own previous record of 9 hours, 27 minutes). His average ground speed during the flight was 322 mph (518 km/h).
 First intercontinental commercial airline flights.
 The chocolate chip cookie is developed in 1938 by Ruth Graves Wakefield.
 The Frying Pan becomes the first electric lap steel guitar ever produced.
 Edwin Armstrong invents wide-band frequency modulation radio in 1933.
 The bass guitar is invented by Paul Tutmarc of Seattle, Washington, in 1936.

Science

 Astronomer Clyde Tombaugh discovers Pluto in 1930, which goes on to be announced as the ninth planet in the Solar System.
 Albert Einstein's equations form the basis for creation of the atomic bomb.

Popular culture

Literature and art
 Height of the Art Deco movement in North America and Western Europe.
 Notable poetry include W. H. Auden's Poems.
 Notable literature includes F. Scott Fitzgerald's Tender Is the Night (1934), T. H. White's The Sword in the Stone (1938), J. R. R. Tolkien's The Hobbit (1937), Aldous Huxley's Brave New World (1932), John Steinbeck's Grapes of Wrath (1939) and Of Mice and Men (1937), Ernest Hemingway's To Have and Have Not (1937), John Dos Passos's U.S.A trilogy, William Faulkner's As I Lay Dying (1930) and Absalom, Absalom! (1936), John O'Hara's Appointment in Samarra (1934) and Butterfield 8 (1935), and Margaret Mitchell's Gone with the Wind (1936), which was later famously adapted into a film in 1939.
 Notable "hardboiled" crime fiction includes Raymond Chandler's The Big Sleep, Dashiell Hammett's The Maltese Falcon, James M. Cain's The Postman Always Rings Twice (1934).
 Notable plays include Thornton Wilder's Our Town (1938).
 Near the end of the decade, two of the world's most iconic superheroes and recognizable fictional characters were introduced in comic books; Superman first appeared in 1938, and Batman in 1939.
 The pulp fiction magazines begin to feature distinctive, gritty adventure heroes that combine elements of hard-boiled detective fiction and the fantastic adventures of earlier pulp novels. Two particularly noteworthy characters introduced during this time are Doc Savage and The Shadow, who would later influence the creation of characters such as Superman and Batman.
 Popular comic strips which began in the 1930s include Captain Easy by Roy Crane, Alley Oop by V. T. Hamlin, Prince Valiant by Hal Foster, and Flash Gordon by Alex Raymond.
 David Alfaro Siqueiros paints the controversial mural América Tropical (full name: América Tropical: Oprimida y Destrozada por los Imperialismos, or Tropical America: Oppressed and Destroyed by Imperialism) (1932) at Olvera Street in Los Angeles, California.

Best-selling books 

The best-selling books of every year in the United States were as follows:

 1930: Cimarron by Edna Ferber
 1931: The Good Earth by Pearl S. Buck
 1932: The Good Earth by Pearl S. Buck
 1933: Anthony Adverse by Hervey Allen
 1934: Anthony Adverse by Hervey Allen
 1935: Green Light by Lloyd C. Douglas
 1936: Gone with the Wind by Margaret Mitchell
 1937: Gone with the Wind by Margaret Mitchell
 1938: The Yearling by Marjorie Kinnan Rawlings
 1939: The Grapes of Wrath by John Steinbeck

Film

 Charlie Chaplin's groundbreaking classic, "City Lights", was released in 1931.
 Charlie Chaplin's last film featuring his signature character, "The Tramp", was subsequently released in 1936.
 Walt Disney's Snow White and the Seven Dwarfs was released in 1937.
 The Little Princess was released in 1939.
 The Wizard of Oz was released in 1939.
 In the art of filmmaking, the Golden Age of Hollywood enters a new era after the advent of talking pictures ("talkies") in 1927 and full-color films in 1930: more than 50 classic films were made in the 1930s; most notable were Gone With The Wind and The Wizard of Oz.
 The new soundtrack and photographic technologies prompted many films to be made or re-made, such as the 1934 version of Cleopatra, using lush art deco sets, which won an Academy Award (see films 1930–1939 in Academy Award for Best Cinematography).
 Universal Pictures begins producing its distinctive series of horror films, which came to be known as the Universal Monsters, featuring what would become iconic representations of literary and mythological monsters. The horror films (or monster movies) included many cult classics, such as Dracula, Frankenstein, The Mummy, Dr. Jekyll and Mr. Hyde, King Kong, The Hunchback of Notre Dame, and other films about wax museums, vampires, and zombies, leading to the 1941 film The Wolf Man. These films led to the stardom of stars such as Bela Lugosi, Lon Chaney Jr, and Boris Karloff.
 Recurring series and serials included The Three Stooges, Laurel and Hardy, the Marx Brothers, Tarzan, Charlie Chan and Our Gang.
 In 1930, Howard Hughes produces Hell's Angels, the first movie blockbuster to be produced outside of a professional studio, independently, and at the time the most expensive movie ever made, costing roughly 4 million dollars and taking four years to make.

Highest-grossing films

Radio

 Radio becomes dominant mass media in industrial nations, serving as a way for citizens to listen to music and get news- providing rapid reporting on current events. 
 October 30, 1938 – Orson Welles' radio adaptation of The War of the Worlds is broadcast, causing panic in various parts of the United States.

Music

 "Swing" music starts becoming popular from 1933, the dawn of the Swing era. It gradually replaces the sweet form of Jazz that had been popular for the first half of the decade.
 "Delta Blues" music, the first recorded in the late 1920s, was expanded by Robert Johnson and Skip James, two of the most important and influential acts of "Blues" genre.
 Django Reinhardt and Stéphane Grappelli led the development of Gypsy jazz.
 Sergei Rachmaninoff composed Rhapsody on a Theme of Paganini in 1934.
 Charlie Christian becomes the first electric guitarist to be in a multiracial band with Benny Goodman and Lionel Hampton in 1939.
The most popular music of each year was as follows:

 1930: Body and Soul (music by Johnny Green, lyrics by Edward Heyman, Robert Sour and Frank Eyton)
 1931: Life Is Just a Bowl of Cherries (music by Ray Henderson, lyrics by Lew Brown)
 1932: Night and Day (Cole Porter)
 1933: It’s Only a Paper Moon (music by Harold Arlen, lyrics by Yip Harburg and Billy Rose)
 1934: Blue Moon (written by Richard Rodgers and Lorenz Hart)
 1935: Begin the Beguine (Cole Porter)
 1936: I'm an Old Cowhand (written by Johnny Mercer, sung by Bing Crosby)
 1937: A Foggy Day (composed by George Gershwin, with lyrics by Ira Gershwin)
 1938: Chiquita Banana
 1939: All the Things You Are (composed by Jerome Kern with lyrics written by Oscar Hammerstein II)

Fashion

The most characteristic North American fashion trend from the 1930s to 1945 was attention at the shoulder, with butterfly sleeves and banjo sleeves, and exaggerated shoulder pads for both men and women by the 1940s. The period also saw the first widespread use of man-made fibers, especially rayon for dresses and viscose for linings and lingerie, and synthetic nylon stockings. The zipper became widely used. These essentially U.S. developments were echoed, in varying degrees, in Britain and Europe. Suntans (called at the time "sunburns") became fashionable in the early 1930s, along with travel to the resorts along the Mediterranean, in the Bahamas, and on the east coast of Florida where one can acquire a tan, leading to new categories of clothes: white dinner jackets for men and beach pajamas, halter tops, and bare midriffs for women.

Revolutionary designer and couturier Madeleine Vionnet gained popularity for her bias-cut technique, which clung, draped, and embraced the curves of the natural female body. Fashion trendsetters in the period included The Prince of Wales (King Edward VIII from January 1936 until his abdication that December) and his companion Wallis Simpson (the Duke and Duchess of Windsor from their marriage in June 1937), socialites like Nicolas de Gunzburg, Daisy Fellowes and Mona von Bismarck, and Hollywood movie stars such as Fred Astaire, Carole Lombard, and Joan Crawford.

Architecture

 The world's tallest building (for the next 35 years) was constructed, opening as the Empire State Building on May 3, 1931, in New York City.
 The Golden Gate Bridge was constructed, opening on May 27, 1937, in San Francisco, USA.

Visual arts

Social realism became an important art movement during the Great Depression in the United States in the 1930s. Social realism generally portrayed imagery with socio-political meaning. Other related American artistic movements of the 1930s were American scene painting and Regionalism which were generally depictions of rural America, and historical images drawn from American history. Precisionism with its depictions of industrial America was also a popular art movement during the 1930s in the USA. During the Great Depression the art of photography played an important role in the Social Realist movement. The work of Dorothea Lange, Walker Evans, Margaret Bourke-White, Lewis Hine, Edward Steichen, Gordon Parks, Arthur Rothstein, Marion Post Wolcott, Doris Ulmann, Berenice Abbott, Aaron Siskind, Russell Lee, Ben Shahn (as a photographer) among several others were particularly influential.

The Works Progress Administration part of the Roosevelt Administration's New Deal sponsored the Federal Art Project, the Public Works of Art Project, and the Section of Painting and Sculpture which employed many American artists and helped them to make a living during the Great Depression.

Mexican muralism was a Mexican art movement that took place primarily in the 1930s. The movement stands out historically because of its political undertones, the majority of which of a Marxist nature, or related to a social and political situation of post-revolutionary Mexico. Also in Latin America Symbolism and Magic Realism were important movements.

In Europe during the 1930s and the Great Depression, Surrealism, late Cubism, the Bauhaus, De Stijl, Dada, German Expressionism, Symbolist and modernist painting in various guises characterized the art scene in Paris and elsewhere.
The 1932 Winter Olympics were hosted by the village of Lake Placid, New York, United States.
The 1932 Summer Olympics were hosted by the city of Los Angeles, California, United States.
The 1934 FIFA World Cup was hosted and won by Italy.
The 1936 Winter Olympics were hosted by the market town of Garmisch-Partenkirchen, Bavaria, Germany.
The 1936 Summer Olympics were hosted by the city of Berlin, Germany. These were the last Summer or Winter Olympic Games held until 1948.
The 1938 FIFA World Cup was hosted by France and won by Italy. This was the last FIFA World Cup held until 1950.

People

Actors/entertainers

 Fred Allen
 Jean Arthur
 Fred Astaire
 Mary Astor
 Gene Autry
 Tallulah Bankhead
 Warner Baxter
 Wallace Beery
 Constance Bennett
 Joan Bennett
 Jack Benny
 Charles Bickford
 Joan Blondell
 Humphrey Bogart
 Charles Boyer
 Mary Brian
 Louise Brooks
 Fanny Brice
 James Cagney
 Eddie Cantor
 Frank Capra
 John Carradine
 Madeleine Carroll
 Charlie Chaplin
 Claudette Colbert
 Ronald Colman
 Katharine Cornell
 Gary Cooper
 Joan Crawford
 Bing Crosby
 Bette Davis
 Marlene Dietrich 
 Walt Disney
 Robert Donat
 Irene Dunne
 Deanna Durbin
 Ann Dvorak
 Nelson Eddy
 Alice Faye
 Errol Flynn
 Henry Fonda
 Joan Fontaine
 John Ford
 Kay Francis
 Dwight Frye
 Clark Gable
 Carlos Gardel 
 Eva Le Gallienne
 Greta Garbo
 Judy Garland
 Janet Gaynor
 Cary Grant
 Lillian Gish
 Jean Harlow
 Olivia de Havilland
 Helen Hayes
 Katharine Hepburn
 Bob Hope
 Miriam Hopkins
 Leslie Howard
 Boris Karloff
 Buster Keaton
 Laurel and Hardy
 Dorothy Lamour
 Charles Laughton
 Vivien Leigh
 Carole Lombard
 Myrna Loy
 Bela Lugosi
 Fredric March
 The Marx Brothers
 Jeanette MacDonald
 Fred MacMurray
 Herbert Marshall
 Ethel Merman
 Robert Montgomery
 Paul Muni
 Merle Oberon
 Laurence Olivier
 Maureen O'Sullivan
 William Powell
 Tyrone Power
 George Raft
 Luise Rainer
 Basil Rathbone
 Ronald Reagan
 Dolores del Río 
 Edward G. Robinson
 Ginger Rogers
 Will Rogers
 Cesar Romero
 Mickey Rooney
 Rosalind Russell
 Randolph Scott
 Sebastian Shaw
 Norma Shearer
 James Stewart
 Barbara Stanwyck
 Margaret Sullavan
 Robert Taylor
 Shirley Temple
 The Three Stooges
 Spencer Tracy
 John Wayne
 Orson Welles
 Mae West
 Ed Wynn
 Loretta Young

Filmmakers

 Walt Disney
 Alfred Hitchcock
 Fritz Lang
 John Ford
 Cecil B. DeMille
 Frank Capra
 Jean Renoir
 Ernst Lubitsch
 William Wyler
 Howard Hawks
 Victor Fleming
 George Cukor
 Michael Curtiz
 Josef von Sternberg

Musicians

 Lale Anderson
 Harold Arlen
 Louis Armstrong
 Fred Astaire
 Count Basie
 Dalida
 Cab Calloway
 Eddie Cantor
 Nat King Cole
 Noël Coward
 Bing Crosby
 Vernon Duke
 Jimmy Durante
 Duke Ellington
 Ella Fitzgerald
 George Gershwin
 Ira Gershwin
 Benny Goodman
 Coleman Hawkins
 Billie Holiday
 Pete Johnson
 Louis Prima
 Artie Shaw
 Big Joe Turner
 Les Brown
 Lena Horne
 Al Jolson
 Jerome Kern
 Lead Belly
 The Ink Spots
 Glenn Miller
 Earl Hines
 Édith Piaf
 Cole Porter
 Ma Rainey
 Django Reinhardt
 Bill "Bojangles" Robinson
 Rodgers and Hart
 Frank Sinatra
 Bessie Smith
 Fats Waller
 Ethel Waters

Influential artists

Painters and sculptors

José Clemente Orozco
Anni Albers
Josef Albers
Hans Arp
Milton Avery
Romare Bearden
Paula Modersohn-Becker
Max Beckmann
Thomas Hart Benton
Max Bill
Isabel Bishop
Marcel Breuer
Patrick Henry Bruce
Paul Cadmus
Marc Chagall
John Steuart Curry
Salvador Dalí
Stuart Davis
Charles Demuth
Otto Dix
Theo van Doesburg
Arthur Dove
Marcel Duchamp
Max Ernst
David Alfaro Siqueiros
Philip Evergood
Lyonel Feininger
Joaquín Torres García
Alberto Giacometti
Arshile Gorky
John D. Graham
George Grosz
Philip Guston
Marsden Hartley
Hans Hofmann
Edward Hopper
Johannes Itten
Frida Kahlo
Wassily Kandinsky
Ernst Ludwig Kirchner
Paul Klee
Oskar Kokoschka
Käthe Kollwitz
Willem de Kooning
Walt Kuhn
Jacob Lawrence
Tamara de Lempicka
Fernand Léger
Andrew Loomis
Reginald Marsh
André Masson
Henri Matisse
Joan Miró
Piet Mondrian
Gabriele Münter
Georgia O'Keeffe
Francis Picabia
Pablo Picasso
Horace Pippin
Diego Rivera
Ben Shahn
Charles Sheeler
David Smith
Isaac Soyer
Rafael Soyer
Chaïm Soutine
Rufino Tamayo
Yves Tanguy
Grant Wood
N. C. Wyeth
Andrew Wyeth

Photography
Ansel Adams
Margaret Bourke-White
Walker Evans
Lewis Hine
Dorothea Lange
Gordon Parks
Man Ray
Edward Steichen
Carl Van Vechten
Edward Weston

Sports figures

Global

 Cliff Bastin (English footballer)
 Donald Bradman (Australian cricketer)
 Haydn Bunton, Sr (Australian Rules footballer)
 Jack Crawford (tennis)
 Jack Dyer (Australian rules football player)
 Wally Hammond (English cricketer)
 Eddie Hapgood (English footballer)
 George Headley (West Indies cricketer)
 Alex James (Scottish footballer)
 Douglas Jardine (English cricketer)
 Harold Larwood (English cricketer)
 Jack Lovelock (New Zealand runner)
 Fred Perry (English tennis player)
 Leonard Hutton, English cricketer
 Percy Williams (sprinter)
 Dhyan Chand, Indian hockey player
 Lala Amarnath, Indian cricketer

United States

 Joe Louis (boxing)
 Lou Ambers (boxing)
 Henry Armstrong (boxing)
 Max Baer (boxing)
 Cliff Battles (halfback)
 Jay Berwanger (halfback)
 James J. Braddock (boxing)
 Ellison M. ("Tarzan") Brown (marathon)
 Don Budge (tennis)
 Tony Canzoneri (boxing)
 Mickey Cochrane (baseball)
 Buster Crabbe (swimming)
 Glenn Cunningham (running)
 Dizzy Dean (baseball)
 Joe DiMaggio (baseball)
 Babe Didrikson (track)
 Leo Durocher (baseball)
 Turk Edwards (tackle)
 Jimmie Foxx (baseball)
 Lou Gehrig (baseball)
 Hank Greenberg (baseball)
 Lefty Grove (baseball)
 Dixie Howell (halfback)
 Don Hutson (end)
 Cecil Isbell (quarterback)
 Bobby Jones (golf)
 John A. Kelley (marathon)
 Nile Kinnick (halfback)
 Tommy Loughran (boxing)
 Alice Marble (tennis)
 Ralph Metcalfe (sprinter)
 Bronko Nagurski (fullback)
 Mel Ott (baseball)
 Jesse Owens (sprinter)
 Satchel Paige (baseball)
 Bobby Riggs (tennis)
 Barney Ross (boxing)
 Babe Ruth (baseball)
 Al Simmons (baseball)
 Helen Stephens (track)
 Eddie Tolan (sprinter)
 Ellsworth Vines (tennis)
 Stella Walsh (sprinter)
 Frank Wykoff (sprinter)

Criminals

Prominent criminals of the Great Depression:
 Al Capone
 Bonnie and Clyde
 John Dillinger
 Baby Face Nelson
 Machine Gun Kelly
 Ma Barker

See also

 Interwar period, worldwide
 International relations (1919–1939)
 Interwar Britain
 Great Depression
 Great Depression in the United States
 European interwar economy
 Causes of the Great Depression
 Cities in the Great Depression
 Dust Bowl
 Entertainment during the Great Depression
 Timeline of the Great Depression
Timeline of events preceding World War II
 Events preceding World War II in Asia
 Events preceding World War II in Europe 
Areas annexed by Nazi Germany and the pre-war German territorial claims on them
Diplomatic history of World War II
 European Civil War
 1930s in literature

Timeline
The following articles contain brief timelines which list the most prominent events of the decade:

References

Books and Magazines on Film

Works cited

Further reading
 Brendon, Piers. The Dark Valley: A Panorama of the 1930s (2000) global political history; 816pp excerpt
 Cornelissen, Christoph, and Arndt Weinrich, eds. Writing the Great War – The Historiography of World War I from 1918 to the Present (2020) free download; full coverage for major countries. 
Gardiner, Juliet, The Thirties: An Intimate History. London, Harper Press, 2010.  on Britain
 Garraty, John A.  The Great Depression: An Inquiry into the Causes, Course, and Consequences of the Worldwide Depression of the Nineteen-Thirties, As Seen by Contemporaries (1986). 
 Grenville, J.A.S. A History of the World in the Twentieth Century (Harvard UP, 1994) pp 160–251.
 Grossman, Mark. Encyclopedia of the Interwar Years: From 1919 to 1939 (2000). 400pp. worldwide coverage
 Lewis, Thomas Tandy, ed. The Thirties in America. 3 volumes. Pasadena: Salem Press, 2011.
 Watt D.C. et al., A History of the World in the Twentieth Century (1968) pp 423–463.

External links

The Dirty Thirties – Images of the Great Depression in Canada
America in the 1930s Extensive library of projects on America in the Great Depression from American Studies at the University of Virginia
The 1930s Timeline year by year timeline of events in science and technology, politics and society, culture and international events with embedded audio and video. AS@UVA

 
20th century
1930s decade overviews